USS Westerner (ID-2890) was a cargo ship of the United States Navy that served during World War I and its immediate aftermath.

Construction and acquisition

Westerner was laid down as the steel-hulled, single-screw Design 1013 commercial cargo ship SS Westerner by J. F. Duthie and Company in Seattle, Washington, for the United States Shipping Board. She was launched on 4 November 1917 and completed early in 1918. She then steamed to the United States East Coast, where she was transferred to the U.S. Navy on 20 June 1918 at Norfolk, Virginia,  assigned the naval registry identification number 2890, and commissioned the same day as USS Westerner (ID-2890).

Navy career
Assigned to the Naval Overseas Transportation Service (NOTS), Westerner departed Norfolk on 10 July 1918 carrying a cargo of United States Army supplies and steamed to New York City. She departed New York on 24 July 1918 as part of a convoy bound for France. She developed engine trouble, forcing her to spend three days at Halifax, Nova Scotia, Canada, before resuming her voyage to France. She arrived at Brest, France, on 17 August 1918, then moved to St. Nazaire to discharge her cargo.

Westerner departed St. Nazaire on 22 September 1918 and made port at Norfolk on 10 October 1918, where she loaded another cargo of U.S. Army supplies. She subsequently conducted three additional cargo-carrying voyages under the control of NOTS: two to La Pallice, France (on one occasion lifting supplies consigned to the French government), and one to Trieste, Italy, via Gibraltar. After her final NOTS voyage, Westerner made port at New York City on 6 August 1919.

Decommissioning and disposal

Decommissioned on 21 August 1919, Westerner was simultaneously struck from the Navy list and transferred back to the U.S. Shipping Board. Oliver J. Olson & Company became the operator of the ship for the U.S. Shipping Board.

Later career
Once again SS Westerner, the ship operated commercially under Shipping Board control until laid up in the late 1920s. After that, she never returned to service and was abandoned due to age and deterioration in either late 1932 or early 1933.

Notes

References
 
 Online Library of Selected Images: Civilian Ships: Westerner (American Freighter, 1918). Served as USS Westerner (ID # 2890) in 1918-1919
 NavSource Online: Section Patrol Craft Photo Archive Westerner (ID 2890)

Design 1013 ships of the United States Navy
World War I cargo ships of the United States
Ships built by J. F. Duthie & Company
1917 ships